Ashwood School Gymnasium and Auditorium is a historic school gymnasium and auditorium located at Ashwood near Bishopville, Lee County, South Carolina.  It was built in 1938 to serve Ashwood Plantation, the first and largest of the Resettlement Administration (RA) project tracts in South Carolina.  The building served as the school and community gymnasium and as an auditorium for dramatic performances and films.  It is a one-story building with a simplified Colonial Revival style popular in the 1930s in government-sponsored construction.

It was added to the National Register of Historic Places in 2011.

References

New Deal in South Carolina
School buildings on the National Register of Historic Places in South Carolina
Colonial Revival architecture in South Carolina
School buildings completed in 1938
Schools in Lee County, South Carolina
National Register of Historic Places in Lee County, South Carolina